Indiga can refer to:
 Indiga, a river in Nenets Autonomous Okrug, Russia
 Indiga (village), in Nenets Autonomous Okrug, Russia
 MT Indiga, Russian tanker
 Indiga (band), Belorussian musical group led by Maryna Shukyurava